The Communist Party of Moldavia (PCM; Moldovan Cyrillic: Партидул Комунист ал Молдовей) was the ruling and the sole legal political party in the Moldavian SSR, and one of the fifteen republic-level parties that formed the Communist Party of the Soviet Union (CPSU) until the fall of the Soviet Union in 1991. During World War II, it was the driving force of the Moldovan resistance against Axis occupation.

The party began to weaken politically during the Perestroika period, which was marked by riots against Soviet rule. The party leader, Semion Grossu was replaced with Petru Lucinschi on November 16, 1989.

On August 23, the Communist Party was banned; subsequently, on 27 August 1991 Moldova declared Independence and the Moldavian Soviet Socialist Republic came to an end. On 7 September 1993, the Parliament of Moldova lifted the ban on communist activities.

First Secretaries

Aftermath 
In 1993, former PCM members founded the Party of Communists of the Republic of Moldova (PCRM), which became the largest party in Moldova since the 2001 elections, and the ruling party from 2001 to 2009. In 2011 a group of communists led by the executive secretary of the old Communist Party of Moldova, Igor Cucer, came to the public attention, claiming that they are the "real communists" and they want to revive the party (PCM) formally; they also stated that the PCRM has become a pseudo-Communist and liberal-bourgeois party serving the interests of one of the county’s richest men, Oleg Voronin, son of president of Moldova from 2001 to 2009 and leader of the PCRM Vladimir Voronin. Cucer claimed then: "The PCRM's 8-year rule made the poor poorer and the rich richer".

The Commission for the Study of the Communist Dictatorship in Moldova was created in 2010 to study and analyze the 1917–1991 period of the communist regime.

See also 
:Category:Communist Party of Moldavia politicians

References

1940 establishments in the Moldavian Soviet Socialist Republic
1991 disestablishments in Moldova
Banned communist parties
Moldova
Communist parties in Moldova
Moldavian Soviet Socialist Republic
Parties of one-party systems
Political parties disestablished in 1991
Political parties established in 1940